The 2019 Winnipeg National Bank Challenger was a professional tennis tournament played on outdoor hard courts. It was the 4th edition of the tournament and part of the 2019 ATP Challenger Tour. It took place in Winnipeg, Manitoba, Canada between July 8 and July 14, 2019.

Singles main-draw entrants

Seeds

1 Rankings are as of July 1, 2019.

Other entrants
The following players received wildcards into the singles main draw:
 Justin Boulais
 Gabriel Diallo
 Chaz Doherty
 Jack Mingjie Lin
 Nicaise Muamba

The following player received entry into the singles main draw using a protected ranking:
  Carlos Gómez-Herrera

The following players received entry into the singles main draw as alternates:
  Joshua Peck
  Bernardo Saraiva

The following players received entry into the singles main draw using their ITF World Tennis Ranking:
  Jacob Grills
  Shintaro Imai
  Filip Cristian Jianu
  Strong Kirchheimer
  Alexander Lebedev
  Issei Okamura

The following players received entry from the qualifying draw:
 Hans Hach Verdugo
 Toshihide Matsui

The following player received entry as a lucky loser:
 Kevin Kylar

Champions

Singles

 Norbert Gombos def.  Brayden Schnur 7–6(7–3), 6–3.

Doubles
 
 Darian King /  Peter Polansky def.  Hunter Reese /  Adil Shamasdin 7–6(10–8), 6–3.

References

External links
Official website

2019 ATP Challenger Tour
2019
2019 in Canadian tennis
July 2019 sports events in Canada